Henry Harper Green (July 23, 1837 – May 9, 1921) was an American physician and politician from New York.

Life 
Green was born on July 23, 1837 in Paines Hollow, New York. His parents were Dr. Abel Green and Eliza Harter.

Green attended school in Little Falls and the Fairfield Academy. In 1859, he graduated from Geneva Medical College, the same medical school his father attended. He lived and had a large practice in Paines Hollow. He was a member of the New York State Medical Society and president of the Herkimer County Agricultural Society.

In 1890, Green was elected to the New York State Assembly as a Republican, representing Herkimer County. He served in the Assembly in 1891 and 1892.

Green was a Methodist. In 1855, he married Julia Loomis. They had three daughters, Mary E., Alice R., and Eliza H.

Green died at home on May 9, 1921. He was buried in the Mohawk Cemetery.

References

External links 
 The Political Graveyard
 Henry H. Green at Find a Grave

1837 births
1921 deaths
People from German Flatts, New York
Geneva Medical College alumni
Republican Party members of the New York State Assembly
19th-century American politicians
Methodists from New York (state)
Burials in New York (state)
Physicians from New York (state)
19th-century American physicians